Man in Black is the 38th overall album by country singer Johnny Cash, released on Columbia Records in 1971. Many of the songs on the album contain political references, either broad or specific, while the title song refers both to Cash's tendency to wear black at live shows and to the tumultuous times in which the song was created, implying the Vietnam War. The album's name also eventually became Cash's informal nickname, given to him by the public. Two tracks — "Man in Black" and "Singin' in Vietnam Talkin' Blues" — were released as singles, the former peaking at No. 3 on the Country chart. The first track features Billy Graham.

Track listing

Personnel
 Johnny Cash – vocals, acoustic guitar, production
 Norman Blake – acoustic guitar
 June Carter Cash – vocals
 Marshall Grant – bass guitar
 Billy Graham – vocals on "The Preacher Said Jesus Said"
 W. S. Holland – drums
 Farrell Morris – percussion
 Carl Perkins – electric guitar
 Jerry Shook – acoustic guitar
 Bob Wootton – electric guitar
Technical
Charlie Bragg - engineer
Bill Grein - photography

Charts
Album – Billboard (United States)

Singles – Billboard (United States)

References

1971 albums
Columbia Records albums
Johnny Cash albums